Barkam or Markang or Muerkvua is a county-level city in Ngawa Tibetan and Qiang Autonomous Prefecture, in the northwest of Sichuan province, People's Republic of China. The city seat is the town of Barkam.

Administrative divisions
Barkam has four towns and 10 townships:

Towns
 Barkam
 Zhuokeji
 Songgang
 Sha'erzong

Townships
 Suomo
 Baiwan
 Dangba
 Mu'erzong
 Jiaomuzu
 Longerjia
 Dazang
 Kangshan
 Caodeng
 Ribu

Transport
China National Highway 317

Climate
Due to its elevation, Barkam lies in the transition between a subtropical highland climate (Köppen Cwb) and humid continental climate (Köppen Dwb), with strong monsoonal influences; winters are frosty and summers warm with frequent rain. Nearly two-thirds of the annual precipitation of  occurs from June to September. With monthly percent possible sunshine ranging from 36% in June to 65% in December, the town receives 2,133 hours of bright sunshine annually. Diurnal temperature variation is large, averaging  annually.

Demographics
The area is traditionally inhabited by a branch of Rgyalrong people who speak the Situ language.

Notes

External links
  Maerkang County Government site - 
  Maerkang - bashu.net - 

County-level cities in Sichuan
Ngawa Tibetan and Qiang Autonomous Prefecture